The Isturitz and Oxocelhaya caves (French: Grottes d'Isturitz et d'Oxocelhaya) are an important Paleolithic site where a Neanderthal mandible was found, as well as later modern human finds associated with the Aurignacian, Solutrean and Magdalenian. They also include cave paintings and bone flutes. The caves are located in the Gazetelu hill in the Arberoue Valley in the foothills of Pyrenees, in Lower Navarre, a traditional region of the department of Pyrénées-Atlantiques, southwestern France, part of the French Basque Country. 

The French government has classified the site as a Monument historique since 1953. Occupation by Neanderthal and Homo sapiens communities extends over a period from 80,000–10,000 years BP, and continued to be use (perhaps only for burials) until Roman times. The site is discussed within the context of Franco-Cantabrian prehistory, as among the easternmost decorated caves that extended along the Pyrenees and Cantabrian Mountains.

Topography 

The caves are within the territories of the communes of Isturits et de Saint-Martin-d'Arberoue, in the vicinity of Hasparren. They form part of a system of three caves carved into the limestone Gaztelu hill in succession by the Arbéroue stream, which flows into the Lihoury, a tributary of the Bidouze. The hill itself is surmounted by the Rocafort castle.

 Isturitz Cave: the high cave in the hill, with openings on both sides of the hill.
 Oxocelhaya Cave: 20 meters below Isturitz, notable for its calcite concretions. 
 Erberua Cave: where the Arbéroue stream runs today, with a siphon at each end; not explored until 1973.

Isturitz cave
The Isturitz cave is divided into two parts: the Hall of Saint-Martin (or South Hall) and the Main Hall or Hall of Isturitz (or North Hall). At the beginning of the Mesolithic, the opening that faces the town of Saint-Martin-d’Arberoue is estimated to have been 15 and 20 m wide and about 10 m high, making it visible to humans a distance.

Human remains
The most common human remains from Isturitz are cranial vaults, which have been cut-marked and modified to create drinking cups ("coupelles"), dating from the Magdalenian (∼15 to 12,000 years BP).

Gallery

Source
This article incorporates material from the corresponding article in French wikipedia.

References

External links
 Official website

Stone Age sites in France
Caves containing pictograms in France
Rock art in France
Neanderthal sites